Alan Chen Stokes and Alex Chen Stokes are Chinese-American twins and Internet celebrities known for their YouTube and TikTok accounts with 19.2 million subscribers and 31.1 million followers respectively. They began making videos separately and then combined their following into a shared twins account. As of 2022, their YouTube channel is the 9th largest in the world as measured by views per episode.

Legal issues 
In August 2020, the Stokes Twins were charged with false imprisonment effected by violence, menace, fraud or deceit and falsely reporting an emergency in connection, or swatting with a YouTube video that they had recorded in October 2019. The video contained two separate fake bank robberies as pranks, where the brothers pretended to be robbers; dressed all in black, wearing ski masks and carrying duffle bags, and are attempting to make a getaway by asking unsuspecting people for clothing items or transportation help.

At one instance, they called an Uber driver, who was not aware of the prank, and after the driver refused to drive them they attempted to coerce him. Numerous bystanders called police in both prank attempts and footage of the pair being stopped by officers were added to the video. The Uber driver was held at gunpoint by responding officers until it was determined the driver was not involved, and the brothers were warned but not arrested and continued to film the video with a second prank four hours later at University of California, Irvine.

The twins' attorneys have raised claims that the twins are not guilty of the charges as responding officers from the first prank reportedly gave suggestions for the video being filmed, and one brother reportedly called the Irvine Police Department's non-emergency line twice to tell them about the prank prior to the video being filmed. Their attorneys also raised concerns about the length of time between the video and the charges; ten months, and that the twins were not notified about the charges until after the department issued a press release about them.

On April 1, 2021, the twins pleaded guilty in a plea bargain, and were sentenced to 160 hours community service and a year of probation.

References 

1996 births
American people of Chinese descent
American TikTokers
American YouTubers
Criminals from Florida
Criminals from Tennessee
Living people
Male twins
Mass media people from Tennessee
People from Hollywood, Florida
People from Tennessee
Social media influencers